Eshcol (’Eškōl) is a term in the Hebrew Bible. It may refer to:
 One of three Amorite confederates of Abram in the Hebron area, who, with his brothers Mamre and Aner, joined forces with those of Abram in pursuit of king Chedorlaomer and his armies who had taken Abram's nephew Lot and others as captives.

See also 
Mamre
Aner
Battle of Siddim
Chedorlaomer

References 

Hebrew Bible valleys
Book of Genesis people
Book of Numbers